Splatbooks are sourcebooks devoted to a particular facet, character class, or fictional faction in a role-playing game, providing additional background details and rules options. For example, a "swords and sorcery" fantasy game might offer splatbooks for each of the races in the setting: humans, dwarves, elves, and others.

The first game to use such books was Dungeons & Dragons, though not described as "splatbooks". The term originally rose to describe the sourcebooks published by White Wolf Game Studio for its World of Darkness games. Many of these books were titled using similar patterns: clanbooks in Vampire: The Masquerade, tribebooks for Werewolf: The Apocalypse, tradition books for Mage: The Ascension, and so forth. In newsgroups, these were called *books (the asterisk on a computer keyboard being used as a wildcard character). Since the asterisk is also known as a "splat", this gave rise to the term "splatbook".

This term was subsequently used retrospectively for Advanced Dungeons & Dragons books such as The Complete Book of Dwarves and Complete Arcane, or the numerous Codices for Warhammer Fantasy Battle and Warhammer 40,000. By extension, the term "splat" is used for the character class described in a splatbook.

See also
 Power creep

Notes

Role-playing game terminology